is a Japanese screenwriter and novelist focusing on anime productions.

Ōnogi attended Keio University in the same years as Macross character designer Haruhiko Mikimoto and creator Shōji Kawamori, both of whom he would first collaborate with in The Super Dimension Fortress Macross.

Filmography 
 The Super Dimension Fortress Macross (1982), Scenario
 The Super Dimension Century Orguss (1983), Script
 Heavy Metal L-Gaim (1984), Script
 Mobile Suit Zeta Gundam (1985), Script
 Hey! Bunbuu (1985), Script
 AD Police (1999), Script (ep 2, 5), Sci-Fi Adviser
 Earth Girl Arjuna (2001), Series Composition, Script
 The Daichis - Earth Defence Family (2001), Script (ep 0, 8, 11)
 The Siamese - First Mission (2001), Scenario
 Magical Witchland (2001), 2D Script Writer
 RahXephon (2002), Screenplay (ep 14, 21–22, 26)
 Heat Guy J (2002), Screenplay (ep 2, 6, 8, 11, 12)
 Mobile Suit Gundam Seed (2002), Scenario
 Macross Zero (2002), Script
 RahXephon: Pluralitas Concentio (2003), Screenplay
 Submarine 707R (2003), Script
 Area 88 (2004), Script
 Mobile Suit Gundam MS IGLOO: The Hidden One Year War (2004), Script
 Mobile Suit Gundam Seed Destiny (2004), Script
 Doraemon (2005–present), Script 
 Aquarion (2005), Series Composition, Screenplay (5, 7, 9, 12, 13, 15, 19, 22, 23, 25, 26)
 Eureka Seven (2005), Script (ep 8, 11, 17, 21, 25, 31, 37, 40, 43, 46)
 Noein - to your other self (2005), Series Composition, Script (ep 5, 11, 15, 19, 23, 24)
 Mobile Suit Gundam MS IGLOO: Apocalypse 0079 (2006), Screenplay
 Kekkaishi (2006), Series Composition
 BALDR FORCE EXE Resolution (2006), Script
 Toward the Terra (2007), Script (ep 11, 13, 23, 24)
 The Skull Man (2007), Script (ep 3, 4, 8, 11)
 Aquarion: Wings of Betrayal (2007), Series Composition
 Aquarion (2007), Screenplay
 Mnemosyne - Mnemosyne no Musume-tachi (2008), Screenplay
 Birdy the Mighty Decode (2008), Series Composition
Xam'd: Lost Memories (2008), Script (ep 22, 23)
 Hokuto no Ken Raoh Gaiden: Ten no Haoh (2008), Screenplay
 Shugo Chara!! Doki— (2008), Series Composition
 Birdy the Mighty Decode:02 (2009), Series Composition
 Fullmetal Alchemist: Brotherhood (2009), Series Composition
 Shangri-La (2009), Series Composition
 Seisen Cerberus: Ryūkoku no Fatalite (2016), Series Composition
 GeGeGe no Kitarō (2018), Series Composition
 Phantasy Star Online 2: Episode Oracle (2019), Series Composition
 How a Realist Hero Rebuilt the Kingdom (2021), Script
 D_Cide Traumerei the Animation (2021), Script
 Akuma-kun (2023), Script

Bibliography 
Ohnogi has adapted several television shows into novels. A few of these are listed below.
Royal Space Force: The Wings of Honneamise
Genesis of Aquarion
RahXephon

External links
 

Anime screenwriters
20th-century Japanese novelists
21st-century Japanese novelists
Living people
1959 births